St Augustine's Church is the Anglican parish church of Flimwell, a village in the Rother district of East Sussex, England. It was consecrated in 1839 after architect Decimus Burton had built the nave and tower, which was then topped with a spire in 1873.  The building was extended six years later by the addition of a chancel.  The church has grade II listed building status.

See also
List of places of worship in Rother

References

External links
 St Augustine church, Flimwell

Church of England church buildings in East Sussex
Grade II listed churches in East Sussex
Rother District